Virginia Beach Theological Seminary is a private evangelical Christian seminary in Virginia Beach, Virginia. It was founded in 1995 as Central Baptist Theological Seminary of Virginia Beach and only offers graduate degrees.

Academics
Virginia Beach Theological Seminary has five full-time and two part-time faculty. The seminary offers the following degrees: Master of Divinity, Master of Biblical Studies, Master of Biblical Studies Online Option, Master of Biblical Studies for the Chaplaincy, and Master of Theology. The seminary is accredited by the Transnational Association of Christian Colleges and Schools.

The seminary has over 150 alumni serving in ministries around the United States and other countries.

References

External links

Education in Virginia Beach, Virginia
Seminaries and theological colleges in Virginia